Zhu Yi (born Beverly Zhu on September 19, 2002) is an American-born Chinese figure skater who competes in women's singles. She has competed in the final segment at two ISU Championships, placing 13th at the 2020 Four Continents Championships and 22nd at 2020 World Junior Championships.

She won the 2018 U.S. national novice title before representing China internationally.

Personal life 
Zhu was born on September 19, 2002, in Westwood, Los Angeles, California, United States. Her parents, Cui Jie and Zhu Songchun, immigrated to the United States from China. Her father was a computer expert and professor at the University of California, Los Angeles, before moving to Peking University. 

Zhu reportedly renounced her U.S. citizenship in 2018 after deciding to compete for China. She also changed her name from Beverly Zhu to Zhu Yi. Zhu is one of a number of foreign-born athletes who chose to become naturalised Chinese citizens or who gained permanent residency status in China to compete at the 2022 Winter Olympics. She lives and trains in Beijing, China.

Career

Early career 
Zhu started skating at seven years old after her mother's friend's daughter started lessons. She narrowly missed qualifying to the U.S. National Championships in 2016 and 2017 after finishing fifth at Sectionals both seasons.

2017–2018 season 
Zhu placed second at the 2017–18 Pacific Coast Sectionals to qualify to the U.S. National Championships for the first time. She won the novice title in her Nationals debut at the 2018 U.S. Championships with a record score of 167.69 points.

2018–2019 season 
Zhu switched to representing her parents' native country of China in September 2018 as part of the country's "Morning Road" initiative to recruit top athletes leading up to the 2022 Winter Olympics in Beijing. She trained with five Chinese ice dancers in a group led by Chen Lu and five foreign coaches up through December. 

In 2019, she received Chinese citizenship and began to represent China officially in figure skating events. Zhu placed fourth at the 2019 Chinese Championships in Harbin at the end of December. In February, she competed at the Sofia Trophy, where she won the bronze medal.

2019–2020 season 
Zhu was assigned to her first Grand Prix event, 2019 Cup of China, where she finished 11th. She then placed 14th at 2019 CS Golden Spin of Zagreb, 8th at the 2020 Mentor Toruń Cup, 13th at the 2020 Four Continents Championships, and 22nd at the 2020 World Junior Championships.

2020–2021 season 
Zhu was assigned to compete at the 2020 Skate Canada International, but the event was canceled as a result of the COVID-19 pandemic.

2021–2022 season 
Zhu was assigned to compete at the 2021 Cup of China. The event was canceled on August 17 and subsequently replaced by the 2021 Gran Premio d'Italia, to which Zhu was reassigned. She began the season at the 2021 CS Asian Open Trophy, the Olympic test event, finishing in seventh place. She was ninth at the Gran Premio with a career-best score of 171.25 points, saying afterward "I didn't do everything, but I met my goals."

Zhu was chosen as the lone women's singles entry for the Chinese Olympic team over Chen Hongyi. Her selection drew criticism from Chinese skating fans, who felt stars like Chen and Texas-born Ashley Lin would be better suited. She began the 2022 Winter Olympics as the Chinese entry in the women's segments of the Olympic team event. With the women as the last of the four short program segments, the Chinese team was in third place going in, behind only the United States and ROC. Zhu fell on her jump combination, crashing into the boards of the rink, and singled a planned triple loop. As a result, she placed last in the segment with 47.03 points (below her season best of 60 points), dropping the Chinese team from third place to a tie for fifth. Afterward, she said that she was "upset and a little embarrassed." In the free skate, Zhu fell twice and again placed last in the segment. China finished fifth in the team event.

The performances drew considerable criticism from Weibo users, who also questioned her privileged background and family ties, lack of fluency in Mandarin Chinese, and selection over a native athlete. False rumours also spread that she would rather be interviewed by CNN than Chinese media. Following this, the microblogging company took steps to censor the backlash towards her and related hashtags. In the women's event later on, Zhu finished 27th in the short program and did not advance to the free skate. The performance however drew cheers and applause from the crowd midway through, and reportedly more sympathy on Weibo. In a Chinese media interview afterwards, Zhu said there might have been online comments that affected her at first, but she later adjusted.

Programs

Competitive highlights 
GP: Grand Prix; CS: Challenger Series

For China

For the United States

Detailed results

Senior level

Junior level

References

External links 
 

2002 births
Living people
Chinese female single skaters
Figure skaters at the 2022 Winter Olympics
Figure skaters from Los Angeles
Former United States citizens
Naturalized citizens of the People's Republic of China
Olympic figure skaters of China
People from Westwood, Los Angeles
Victims of cyberbullying